Ste. Genevieve Memorial Cemetery in Ste. Genevieve, Missouri, United States is a contributing site to both the Ste. Genevieve Historic District, and the associated National Landmark District.

History
Opened in 1787, Ste. Genevieve's oldest cemetery is divided into three sections:  one for Catholic burials, one for Lutherans and a third for other Protestants.  More than 50 Native Americans are buried there as well as an unknown number of African Americans, slave and free. It is also the final resting place for such notables as US Senator Lewis F. Linn, Felix and Odile Pratte-Vallé, and many other Missouri pioneers.

Over 5,000 burials occurred in this small, two-block cemetery. The cemetery was closed in 1881, though some additional burials occurred through 1894. Local records show that almost half of those interred were children under six years old.

Notable burials include Lewis F. Linn (1796–1843), physician and US Senator, and John Scott (1782–1861), US Representative.

Preservation
Restoration was performed in the 2010s by the Foundation for Restoration of Ste. Genevieve, Inc.

The cemetery became of part of the National Historic Landmark District in 1960, and the National Register of Historic Places historic district in 1966.

References

External links
 Ste. Genevieve Co, MO Historical and Genealogical Resources
 
 

Cemeteries on the National Register of Historic Places in Missouri
Buildings and structures in Ste. Genevieve County, Missouri
1787 establishments in New Spain
National Historic Landmarks in Missouri
Protected areas of Ste. Genevieve County, Missouri
National Register of Historic Places in Ste. Genevieve County, Missouri
Historic district contributing properties in Missouri